Richard-Wagner-Platz is a Berlin U-Bahn station located on the  in the Charlottenburg district.

History
The original station opened on 14 May 1906 under the name Wilhelmplatz, together with Deutsche Oper the first of several U-Bahn stations designed by Alfred Grenander. At the time it was the western terminus of the first Berlin U-Bahn line (Stammstrecke) after the line's extension from Knie (today Ernst-Reuter-Platz) to the Charlottenburg town hall. However, further extensions in 1908 branched off at Deutsche Oper straight westwards to Reichskanzlerplatz (today Theodor-Heuss-Platz) and the affluent Westend area, so the track to Wilhelmplatz remained a stub. In 1935 the station was renamed after the composer Richard Wagner. It was directly hit during the Battle of Berlin.

A short-distance train from Deutsche Oper served the station until it was finally closed and demolished in 1970. The new Richard-Wagner-Platz station opened on 28 April 1978 with the extension of the U7 line from Fehrbelliner Platz. It features several Byzantine style mosaics of medieval historic figures, the decoration from a former hotel near Potsdamer Platz that had been demolished in 1975. The next station is Bismarckstraße.

References

External links

U7 (Berlin U-Bahn) stations
Buildings and structures in Charlottenburg-Wilmersdorf
Railway stations in Germany opened in 1906
Richard Wagner